The rainbow parrotfish (Scarus guacamaia) is a species of fish in the family Scaridae.

Description
S. guacamaia is among the largest members of its family, and the largest in the Atlantic, reaching  in length, 20 kg in weight and a maximum age of 16 years. It has a greenish-brown overall colouration; the fins are dull orange with tongues of green. Its dental plates are blue-green. Sexes appear alike.

Distribution and habitat
The rainbow parrotfish has a relatively wide distribution in the western Atlantic, and can be found from Bermuda through South Florida, the Bahamas and the Caribbean to Venezuela. It inhabits coral reefs, mangroves and sea grass beds in shallow waters, at depths of 3–25 m.

Ecology
S. guacamaia is primarily a detritivore, feeding on detritus, bacterial colonies and meiofauna but also taking sponges. Young fish appear to recruit mostly to mangroves.

Conservation
S. guacamaia was formerly classified as vulnerable due to overfishing and habitat loss, but because the presently available data do not allow an estimate of the population decline, it is now considered near threatened by the IUCN. It is relatively rare in most of its range, but more common in Bermuda. The rainbow parrotfish is widely harvested in subsistence fisheries in many parts of the Caribbean.

References

External links
 
 

Rainbow parrotfish
Fish of Guatemala
Fish of the Dominican Republic
Fish described in 1829
Taxa named by Georges Cuvier
Fish of the Atlantic Ocean
Taxonomy articles created by Polbot